Muirfield is an Open Championship golf course in Gullane, East Lothian, Scotland.

Muirfield may also refer to:

Muirfield Village, an upscale golf course residential community in Ohio
Muirfield Seamount, a submarine archipelago in the Indian Ocean that is a hazard to navigation
Muirfield High School, a secondary school in New South Wales, Australia
Muirfield, an evil secret organization in Beauty & the Beast